Roberto Jose Aguayo (born May 17, 1994) is an American football placekicker who is a free agent. He played college football at Florida State University, where he was the most accurate kicker in Atlantic Coast Conference (ACC) history and third in NCAA history. He was drafted by the Tampa Bay Buccaneers in the second round of the 2016 NFL Draft, unusually high for a special teams player. Despite an accomplished career at Florida State, Aguayo is considered to be among the biggest "busts" in recent NFL history.

College career 

Aguayo redshirted for the 2012 football season, his freshman season at Florida State. Aguayo led the ACC in points with 157 and field goals converted with 21 in the 2013 season. On December 12, 2013, Aguayo won the 2013 Lou Groza Award. Aguayo led the ACC in field goals made with 27 in the 2014 season. Aguayo announced his intention to forgo his senior season on January 6, 2016, to enter the 2016 NFL Draft. In his three years with Florida State, he successfully connected with 69-of-78 field goal attempts and on all 198 of his extra point attempts.

In July 2021, ESPN named Aguayo as part of their all-time collegiate "Special Teams Mount Rushmore", alongside Sebastian Janikowski, Shane Lechler, and Braden Mann.

Professional career

Tampa Bay Buccaneers 
The Tampa Bay Buccaneers drafted Aguayo with the 59th overall pick in the second round of the 2016 NFL Draft. They acquired the pick in a trade with the Kansas City Chiefs, sending their third and fourth-round selections. Aguayo was the first kicker selected in the second round since Mike Nugent, who was drafted 47th overall in the 2005 NFL Draft by the New York Jets. On June 7, 2016, Aguayo signed his rookie contract, which included a $1.15 million signing bonus. In Week 11, Aguayo went 4-for-4 on field goals and was named NFC Special Teams Player of the Week. However, Aguayo finished the 2016 season with the worst field goal percentage in the NFL among kickers attempting more than two field goals. He went 22-of-31 on field goals as a rookie.

In the 2017 off-season, the Buccaneers signed Nick Folk to compete with Aguayo; his $750,000 guarantee was more than Aguayo's 2017 salary. After missing a 47-yard field goal and an extra point in the Buccaneers' first preseason game, Aguayo was waived by the Buccaneers on August 12, 2017.

Chicago Bears
On August 13, 2017, Aguayo was claimed off waivers by the Chicago Bears. He was waived by the Bears on September 2, 2017.

Carolina Panthers
On October 25, 2017, Aguayo was signed to the Carolina Panthers' practice squad. He was released on December 12, 2017.

Los Angeles Chargers
On January 10, 2018, Aguayo signed a reserve/future contract with the Los Angeles Chargers. 
He went perfect in the preseason (3-of-3 on field goals and 6-of-6 on extra points) and kicked the game-winning field goal in the Chargers' final exhibition. He was waived on September 1, 2018, after losing the kicking job to Caleb Sturgis.

New England Patriots
Aguayo worked out for the New England Patriots on December 21, 2020. On December 26, Aguayo was signed to the Patriots' practice squad after spending nearly two full seasons as a free agent. He signed a reserve/future contract on January 4, 2021. The Patriots released Aguayo on June 17. Aguayo was competing with veteran Nick Folk once again and undrafted free agent Quinn Nordin.

Personal life
Aguayo's younger brother, Ricky Aguayo, took over place kicking duties for Florida State in 2016.

Aguayo is of Mexican descent. He lives in Jupiter, Florida, with his wife Courtney and their two toy poodles: Groza and Stella as of 2019.  In January 2021, Roberto and Courtney got a divorce.   He plays golf, and completed an internship with the PGA of America in 2019.

References

External links

Carolina Panthers bio
Tampa Bay Buccaneers bio
Florida State Seminoles bio

Florida State Seminoles football players
Living people
1994 births
Players of American football from Florida
American football placekickers
American sportspeople of Mexican descent
Sportspeople from Lake County, Florida
All-American college football players
Tampa Bay Buccaneers players
Chicago Bears players
Carolina Panthers players
Los Angeles Chargers players
New England Patriots players